Remembered Prisoners of a Forgotten War: An Oral History of Korean War POWs is a 2002 military history book by Lewis H. Carlson. Using first-hand testimonies by repatriated prisoners of war of their experiences in captivity in Korea, the book demystifies the general perception in the United States that Korean War POWs had been "brainwashed" by their captors, and had betrayed their country.

Carlson (1934–2022) was an American professor of history at Western Michigan University, and was also the author of We Were Each Other's Prisoners: An Oral History of World War II American and German Prisoners of War, published in 1997 by Basic Books.

Remembered Prisoners of a Forgotten War includes the following dedication: This book is dedicated to Studs Terkel, whose oral histories so well illuminate the experiences of those Americans never found in history books, and to all former Korean War prisoners, that no one will again challenge their collective integrity and courage.

Synopsis

Carlson explains that in the early 1950s, the Cold War and McCarthyism left the American public paranoid about the Red Menace and were quick to accuse returning POWs of collaborating with their communist captors. But the reality of the situation was that the primary goal of the prisoners was simply to survive under extreme and unbearable conditions. Carlson states that "their conduct, rather than manifesting personal or societal weaknesses, as their critics charged, was far more likely to reflect the changing conditions of their captivity."

Remembered Prisoners of a Forgotten War contains first-hand testimonies of over 40 repatriated prisoners of war detailing their experiences in captivity. These include accounts of starvation, disease, solitary confinement, abuse and torture. Several prominent events are covered in detail, including the Tiger Death March, which happened in October 1950 when over 800 prisoners were forced to march 100 miles in nine days, resulting in the death of almost two-thirds of them, and the mass killings of American POWs: the Hill 303 massacre, where 41 were executed on a hill above Waegwan in South Korea in August 1950, and the Sunch'ŏn Tunnel Massacre where almost 70 American prisoners were murdered outside a tunnel near Sunch'on in North Korea in October 1950.

Reception
In a review in Leatherneck Magazine, US Marine captain and military historian Keith F. Kopets wrote that Remembered Prisoners of a Forgotten War is not just about memories, it is a "scholarship" that examines facts and opinions about the fate of the Korean War POWs. Kopets stated that "[w]hat Carlson has done, and done well, is set the record straight." Edwin B. Burgess described the POW narratives "remarkable for their forthrightness and matter-of-fact tone." Reviewing the book in Library Journal, Burgess described the prisoners' survival under such brutal conditions as "nothing short of amazing." He said Remembered Prisoners of a Forgotten War will "fit well" with mainstream narrative histories.

A review at Publishers Weekly described Remembered Prisoners of a Forgotten War as a "well-researched account" of what happened to American POWs in Korea. It stated that the book will appeal to historians and those associated with the conflict, but felt that general readers may find it "too weighted" in favor of first-hand testimonies. A reviewer at Kirkus Reviews called the book "informative and moving", but felt that Carlson's decision to use survivors' testimonies results in "an incomplete story" that is "no less biased than the egregious brainwashing films and news stories the vets justly abhor."

References

Bibliography

Selected works citing this book

External links
Remembered Prisoners of a Forgotten War at St. Martin's Press
Remembered Prisoners of a Forgotten War: An Oral History of Korean War POWs at the Internet Archive 

2002 non-fiction books
21st-century history books
Korean War books
Korean War prisoners of war
Oral history